Shin Se-kyung (born July 29, 1990) is a South Korean actress, singer and model. She started as a child actress and had her breakthrough in 2009 with the sitcom High Kick Through the Roof. Since then she starred in the films Hindsight (2011), R2B: Return to Base (2012) and Tazza: The Hidden Card (2014), as well as the television series Deep Rooted Tree (2011), The Girl Who Sees Smells (2015), Six Flying Dragons (2015–2016), The Bride of Habaek (2017), Black Knight: The Man Who Guards Me (2017–2018), Rookie Historian Goo Hae-Ryung (2019), and Run On (2020).

Forbes listed her among the 40 most powerful celebrities in Korea; she ranked 26th in 2011 and 14th in 2012.

Early life and education
She studied at Shinmok High School before enrolling at Chung-Ang University, where she majored in Performing Arts.

Career

1998–2009: Beginnings as a child actress

Shin made her entertainment debut at eight years old in 1998 when she was featured on the cover and poster for Seo Taiji's solo album Take Five. As a child actress, Shin Se Kyung was already known to Koreans for her appearance in the popular children's show Ppo Ppo Ppo, which also starred Big Bang's G-Dragon. She spent her childhood hosting children shows.

After a small part in My Little Bride, she subsequently had starring roles in Cinderella, omnibus films Acoustic and Five Senses of Eros, as well as a well-received turn as the younger version of Princess Cheonmyeong in Queen Seondeok.

2009–2014: Rising popularity and transitioning roles
Shin failed to gain a large following until her breakthrough role as a housemaid on the second season of the popular TV sitcom High Kick! in 2009. Building on her sitcom fame, Shin signed on to numerous television commercials and print advertisement and became one of the most sought celebrity endorser. Lead roles in high-profile acting projects followed, among them film noir Hindsight with Song Kang-ho, the highly rated historical drama Deep Rooted Tree with Jang Hyuk and Han Suk-kyu, and aerial action film R2B: Return to Base with Rain.

However, Shin's next project Fashion King (2012) was poorly received by audiences, particularly its controversial ending. 
Shin then released her first digital single, "You Were Sweet," which she recorded to promote a coffee franchise she models for. A former singer trainee in middle school, Shin has also contributed songs to the soundtrack of Hindsight, the charity album Love Tree Project, and did her own singing in showcase piece Acoustic. In 2012, she recorded a Christmas carol duet with Epitone Project.

Shin returned to television in the 2013 melodrama When a Man Falls in Love opposite Song Seung-heon, but received criticism from viewers for her passive character. In 2014, she played a more "bold and confident" role in the gambling film Tazza: The Hidden Card, followed by the fantasy-action series Blade Man.

2015–present: Resurgence and comeback
In a break from her usual dramatic roles, Shin played an aspiring comedian in the webtoon adaptation The Girl Who Sees Smells in 2015 as the titular character. Shin then reunited with Fashion King costar Yoo Ah-in in Six Flying Dragons (2015–2016), another period drama from the screenwriters of Deep Rooted Tree.

In 2017, Shin starred in tvN's fantasy-romance drama The Bride of Habaek alongside Nam Joo-hyuk. This is followed shortly by another fantasy-romance drama, Black Knight: The Man Who Guards Me alongside Kim Rae-won.

In 2019, Shin starred in the historical drama Rookie Historian Goo Hae-ryung, alongside Cha Eun-woo. In 2020–2021, Shin starred in JTBC's romance drama Run On, alongside Im Si-Wan.

On July 5, 2021, it was announced Shin has signed an exclusive contract with EDAM Entertainment (a subsidiary of Kakao Entertainment) after her contract with Namoo Actors expired.

Personal life 
Shin dated SHINee member Kim Jonghyun in October 2010 until their split in June 2011.

Ambassadorial role
On January 15, 2014, Shin was appointed as the Goodwill ambassador for UNESCO's Korean Committee. The honor serves as recognition for her contributions in promoting Korean Culture and Education and her advocacy for the Korean Language, including her appearance in Deep Rooted Tree. In this capacity, she endorses the vision and the mission of the UNESCO bridge program, both in Korea and outside. Shin was appointed as the Korean hanbok ambassador. She attended the hanbok runway show on October 20, 2017.

Philanthropy 
On December 20, 2022, Shin made a donation from YouTube profits to support sanitary napkins for teenage girls in Korea, by donating through the G Foundation.

Filmography

Film

Television series

Television shows

Music video appearances

Discography

Awards and nominations

Listicles

References

External links

 
 
 
 

1990 births
South Korean television actresses
South Korean film actresses
Living people
21st-century South Korean singers
21st-century South Korean women singers
Chung-Ang University alumni